Justin William Germano (born August 6, 1982) is an American former professional baseball pitcher. He has played in Major League Baseball (MLB) for the San Diego Padres, Cincinnati Reds, Cleveland Indians. Boston Red Sox, Chicago Cubs, Toronto Blue Jays and Texas Rangers. He has also played in Nippon Professional Baseball (NPB) for the Fukuoka SoftBank Hawks and in the KBO League for the Samsung Lions and the KT Wiz.

Early life
Germano is from Claremont, California, where he broke Mark McGwire's Claremont Little League record for most home runs in a season. He graduated from Claremont High School in 2000.

Professional career

San Diego Padres

He was drafted in 2000 by the San Diego Padres. Germano made his major league debut with the San Diego Padres on May 22, 2004, getting the win as the starting pitcher against the Philadelphia Phillies. He pitched five innings, allowing five hits, four runs (three of them on a three-run home run by Chase Utley in the third inning), four walks, and five strikeouts. As a hitter, he would have two at-bats and went hitless.

Cincinnati Reds and return to San Diego

He was traded along with Travis Chick from the Padres to the Cincinnati Reds on July 23, 2005 for Joe Randa. On July 31, 2006, Germano was traded to the Philadelphia Phillies for Rhéal Cormier. On March 19, 2007, Germano was claimed off waivers by the San Diego Padres. He made 23 starts for the Padres in 2007 where he went 7–10 with a 4.46 ERA.

Germano is the first ever MLB pitcher to throw a major league pitch in China, starting for an exhibition game as the Padres starter against the Los Angeles Dodgers. The ball from that first pitch now resides in the Hall of Fame in Cooperstown NY.

Fukuoka SoftBank Hawks
Just after the 2008 season ended, the Fukuoka SoftBank Hawks signed Germano as a free agent. Despite pitching well in spring training and not giving up a single run, Germano did not win a spot on SoftBank's Opening Day roster, as the Hawks were at the limit of foreign players on the roster (Chris Aguila, Kameron Loe, D.J. Houlton, and Brian Falkenborg). However, with Aguila and Loe failing to play well, Germano's chance came during Interleague play. Germano's first start came against the Hiroshima Carp, Germano was credited with the complete-game victory, giving up only two hits.

He continued to pitch well throughout the season. Germano finished the season with a 5–4 record and a 4.38 ERA. In September it was revealed that Germano had been pitching with an inflamed Achilles' tendon, and was knocked out for the rest of the season and the playoffs.

The Hawks stated that they intended to bring Germano back after the offseason started, However, he turned it down, stating he wanted to return to pitch in the States.

Cleveland Indians
On March 17, 2010, Germano signed a minor league contract with the Cleveland Indians. On July 30, 2010 Germano was called up by the Cleveland Indians to join the bullpen for the Friday night game against the Toronto Blue Jays.

Germano was designated for assignment by the Indians on May 19, 2011 to make room on the active roster for Luis Valbuena.

On July 26, 2011, Germano threw a perfect game while on assignment with the Indians' Triple-A affiliate, the Columbus Clippers. He threw 60 strikes in 95 pitches to help lead the Clippers to a 3–0 victory over the Syracuse Chiefs. This was the first perfect game in Clippers history, and only the fifth to be thrown in the history of the International League.

Samsung Lions
Germano was sold to the Samsung Lions of the KBO League on August 5, 2011.

Boston Red Sox
On January 10, 2012, Germano signed a minor league contract with the Boston Red Sox. He also received an invitation to spring training. On July 3, after he exercised his opt-out clause, Germano was called up to the majors to replace Clayton Mortensen, who was optioned to the minors earlier in the day. In his 2012 debut, Germano pitched 5 and 2/3 scoreless innings of relief in a game against the New York Yankees on July 7. He was designated for assignment on July 13.

Chicago Cubs
Germano was traded to the Chicago Cubs on July 19, for cash considerations. Germano posted a 6.75 ERA in 13 appearances (12 starts) with the Cubs. On October 30, Germano elected free agency after being outrighted the previous week.

Toronto Blue Jays
Germano signed a minor league deal with a Spring training invitation with the Blue Jays on November 9, 2012. Germano started the 2013 season with the Triple-A Buffalo Bisons. He was called up to the Blue Jays on April 27. He appeared in one game with Toronto before being designated for assignment on May 3 to make room for Ricky Romero on the 25 man roster. On May 4, the Blue Jays announced that Germano had cleared waivers, and been assigned back to the Bisons. He became a free agent on October 1. In 25 games for Buffalo (24 starts), he went 8–9 with 13 quality starts and a 4.47 ERA, striking out 103 in 151 innings.

Texas Rangers
On December 18, 2013, Germano signed a minor league contract with the Texas Rangers with an invite to spring training. He was assigned to the Triple-A Round Rock Express. The Rangers selected his contract from Round Rock on May 8. He was designated for assignment on May 14, and assigned outright to Round Rock on May 16.

Los Angeles Dodgers
On August 15, 2014, he was traded to the Los Angeles Dodgers for future considerations and assigned to the Triple-A Albuquerque Isotopes. He appeared in three games, with two starts, and was 1-1 with a 9.88 ERA with Albuquerque. Germano elected free agency on October 12, 2014.

KT Wiz
On July 1, 2015, he signed a contract with the KT Wiz of the KBO League.

T & A San Marino 
Germano spent his 2016 season, his last in professional baseball, with T & A San Marino of the Italian Baseball League.

References

External links

Career statistics and player information from KBO League

1982 births
Living people
Akron Aeros players
Albuquerque Isotopes players
American expatriate baseball players in Canada
American expatriate baseball players in Japan
American expatriate baseball players in South Korea
Arizona League Padres players
Baseball players from Pasadena, California
Boston Red Sox players
Buffalo Bisons (minor league) players
Chicago Cubs players
Cincinnati Reds players
Cleveland Indians players
Columbus Clippers players
Eugene Emeralds players
American expatriate baseball players in San Marino
Fort Wayne Wizards players
Fukuoka SoftBank Hawks players
KBO League pitchers
KT Wiz players
Lake Elsinore Storm players
Louisville Bats players
Major League Baseball pitchers
Mobile BayBears players
Nippon Professional Baseball pitchers
Pawtucket Red Sox players
Portland Beavers players
Round Rock Express players
Samsung Lions players
San Diego Padres players
Scranton/Wilkes-Barre Red Barons players
T & A San Marino players
Tacoma Rainiers players
Texas Rangers players
Toronto Blue Jays players